F. Clair Ross (1895–1956) was a Democratic Party politician from Pennsylvania.

Ross grew up in Sandy Lake, Mercer County, Pennsylvania. Graduated from Grove City College in 1914.  He was a veteran of World War I serving with the Army Signal Corps as an aviator.  Ross graduated from Columbia Law and was admitted to the Butler County PA Bar in 1924. He served as an attorney before entering political life.  An active Democrat, Ross was appointed as deputy attorney general in the administration of Governor George Earle. In 1936, Ross was elected Pennsylvania Treasurer, and in 1940 he won a term as Pennsylvania Auditor General. After a protracted primary battle, Ross was nominated as the Democratic candidate for governor in 1942, but he was defeated by Edward Martin. In 1944, Ross won a seat on a seat on the Pennsylvania Superior Court, defeated former governor Arthur James. He suffered a heart attack in 1948 and died of heart-related complications in 1956.

References

Pennsylvania Democrats
1895 births
1956 deaths